The Republic of the Congo competed at the 2018 Summer Youth Olympics in Buenos Aires, Argentina from 6 October to 18 October 2018.

Competitors

Athletics

Congo qualified one athlete to compete in the games.

Girls

Swimming

Congo qualified one male swimmer for the games.

Boys

References

2018 in the Republic of the Congo sport
Nations at the 2018 Summer Youth Olympics
Republic of the Congo at the Youth Olympics